The Brilliant Mistakes is an American rock band based in New York City known for their eclectic mix of pop, rock, folk and soul styles. The group was formed in 1994 by singer-songwriters Alan Walker, a New Yorker, and Erik Philbrook, a transplant from Bangor, Maine, who met while working together at Penguin Books in Manhattan. The band’s moniker comes from a song on Elvis Costello’s King of America album. Other original members of the group included drummer Mickey Wood and guitarist Andy Resnick. Drummer Paul Mauceri replaced Wood in 2000. The group also alternated guitarists, including Cameron Greider, John Putnam, Greg Beshers and Keith Tasker, to record and perform. The Brilliant Mistakes have self-released three full-length studio albums and one EP.

Inspiration
The Brilliant Mistakes have been inspired by a wide variety of artists and styles, including early Elvis Costello and the Attractions, Squeeze, and Crowded House, as well as classic groups like the Beatles, the Byrds, the Beach Boys, the Kinks, and Big Star. Initially considered strictly a power-pop band, The Brilliant Mistakes sound has evolved into a more roots-oriented blend of classic American folk, R&B, and rock styles, with more modern experimental flourishes exemplified by such groups as Wilco, The Jayhawks, the Pernice Brothers, and My Morning Jacket.

Discography

Albums
 All Hands and the Cook (1999, Aunt Mimi's)
 Dumb Luck (2003, Aunt Mimi's)
 Distant Drumming (2008, Aunt Mimi's)

EPs
 Lost Luggage EP (1994)

Compilation appearances
 Lowe Profile: A Tribute to Nick Lowe (2005, Brewery) (song: "Everyone")

Current members
 Erik Philbrook
 Alan Walker
 Paul Mauceri

Former and sometime members
 Mickey Wood
 Andy Resnick
 Greg Beshers
 John Putnam
 Cameron Greider
 Keith Tasker

External links
 
 
 Album review in PopMatters
 Album review in Harp

Rock music groups from New York (state)